Itzik Galili (born 1961 in Tel Aviv) is an Israeli choreographer.

Career
After having been a member of the Bat Sheva Dance Company and Bat Dor Dance Company in his country, he moved to the Netherlands in 1991, where he founded his own company. The Dutch Ministry of Culture nominated him in 1997 as Artistic Director of a new company with public funding, NND/Galili Dance based in Groningen. In 2009, he moved to Amsterdam, invited by the newly appointed city Company of Amsterdam for contemporary dance: Dansgroep Amsterdam (DGA) as co-artistic director together with Kristina de Chatel.

He has built an oeuvre of more than 60 works and has created for and worked with international companies such as: Bale da Cidade de São Paulo, Les Ballets de Monte Carlo, Batsheva Dance Company, Bayerisches Staatsoper Munich, Cisne Negro, Diversions Dance Company, Dutch National Ballet, Gulbenkian Ballet, Les Grands Ballets Canadiens, Nederlands Dans Theater II, Norrdans, Royal Finnish Ballet, Rambert Dance Company, Royal Winnipeg Ballet, Scapino Ballet and the Stuttgart Ballet.

Awards
He was awarded the originality prize at the Gvanim Choreographic Competition in 1991 for “Old Cartoon”.
In 1992, he won the Public Prize at the International Competition for Choreographers in Groningen with his creation “The Butterfly Effect” and was honored in 1994 with the final Selection Culture Award (Phillip Morris) for exceptional talent and ciy (?)
In 2002, he received the VSCD Choreography Prize and a VSCD Nomination for Best Production season 2005–2006.
In 2006, Galili was Knighted in the Netherlands on the royal order of the House of Orange-Nassau.

References

External links
 Dansgroep Amsterdam
 Biography on Dance Consortium, UK
 Dutch Board of Culture about Galili 

Israeli choreographers
Living people
1961 births